Tear Wallet Creek is a stream in Cumberland County, Virginia, in the United States.

Tear Wallet Creek was so named when a man's wallet was torn by hogs.

See also
List of rivers of Virginia

References

Rivers of Cumberland County, Virginia
Rivers of Virginia